The Piper to the Sovereign (also known as the Queen's Piper or King's Piper) is a position in the British Royal Household in which the holder of the office is responsible for playing the bagpipes at the Sovereign's request.

History 
The position was established in 1843 when Queen Victoria and Prince Albert visited the Marquess of Breadalbane at Taymouth Castle a year earlier and discovered the Marquess had his own personal piper. The Queen was taken with the idea of having one for herself, writing to her mother, the Dowager Duchess of Kent:

We have heard nothing but bagpipes since we have been in the beautiful Highlands and I have become so fond of it that I mean to have a Piper, who can if you like it, pipe every night at Frogmore.

The office has been held continuously since then (apart from a brief interruption during World War II) and the piper's main duty is to play at 9am for 15 minutes under the Sovereign's window, and on state occasions.

The first Piper to the Sovereign was Angus MacKay, a noted collector and publisher of piobaireachd. Every subsequent piper has been a serving non-commissioned officer and experienced Pipe Major from a Scottish regiment or an Irish Regiment. While the Piper is a member of the Royal Household, he retains his military rank for the duration of the secondment.

1843–1854: Angus MacKay
1854–1891: PM William Ross, 42nd Highlanders (Black Watch)
1891–1910: PM James Campbell, 42nd Highlanders (Black Watch)
1910–1941: PM Henry Forsyth, Scots Guards
1941–1945: None
1945–1965: PM Alexander MacDonald, Scots Guards
1965–1973: PM Andrew Pitkeathly, Argyll and Sutherland Highlanders
1973–1980: PM David Caird, Royal Highland Fusiliers
1980–1995: PM Brian MacRae, Gordon Highlanders
1995–1998: PM Gordon Webster, Scots Guards
1998–2003: PM Jim Motherwell, Argyll and Sutherland Highlanders
2003–2006: PM Jim Stout, The Highlanders, 1st Battalion
2006–2008: PM Alastair Cuthbertson, 1st Battalion, The Royal Scots
2008–2012: PM Derek Potter RVM, Royal Scots Dragoon Guards
2012–2015: PM David Rodgers, Irish Guards
2015–2019: PM Scott Methven, The Royal Regiment of Scotland
2019–2021: PM Richard Grisdale, The Royal Regiment of Scotland
2021–Present PM Paul Burns, The Royal Regiment of Scotland

See also
 Piper to the Queen Mother

References

External links
Official Royal posts, The Queen's Piper

Positions within the British Royal Household
Ceremonial officers in the United Kingdom
Military music
British military bands
Pipe bands